Garagos is a village in Qena Governorate in Egypt, which is famous for "Garagos Pottery".

The older name of the village is Jazirat Qaraqush. 

This village is the birthplace of Saint Verena.

History 
The village became a center for the development projects of the first Egyptian NGO, the Association of Haute-Égypte (Association of Upper Egypt), founded by Catholic missionaries including the Jesuits Stéphane de Montgolfier (1907-2000), Maurice de Fenoyl (1909-2004), and Philippe Ackermann (1914).  The association founded a School in 1947.  Later under the leadership of Ackermann the village established a pottery studio and installed its workshops in a Nubian-style domed mud-brick building built by the celebrated architect Hassan Fathy.  They also founded a weaving studio for young women, which aimed to provide more opportunities for female development, under the supervision of Folla el-Masri (1919-2003), an Egyptian woman from Asyut.  In the 1950s and '60s the village's artisanal workshops attracted French and Swiss tourists who visited nearby Luxor and offered a model for linking tourism to rural development.

References

Cities in ancient Egypt
Populated places in Qena Governorate
Qus